In distributed computing, CSIv2 (Common Secure Interoperability Protocol Version 2) is a protocol implementing security features for inter-ORB communication.  It intends, in part, to address limitations of SSLIOP.

CSIv2 also facilitates secure EJB-CORBA interoperability.

External links
 OMG Website CSIv2
 Specification (OMG website)

Common Object Request Broker Architecture